Sunil Bal (l; born 1 January 1998) is a Nepalese footballer who plays as a midfielder for Martyr's Memorial A-Division League club Machhindra F.C. and the Nepal national team.

International career 
Sunil played his first international match against Pakistan as a substitute in 2018 at Bangabandhu National Stadium, Dhaka. His first match as a starter was against Bhutan the same year where he scored his first international goal while also assisting in two others in Nepal's 4-0 win.

Career statistics

International

Scores and results list Nepal's goal tally first.

Honours
Nepal
2021 Three Nations Cup: 2021

References

External links

Profile on nepal90.com

Living people
1998 births
Nepalese footballers
Nepal international footballers
Three Star Club players
People from Makwanpur District
Nepal Super League players
Association football midfielders
South Asian Games gold medalists for Nepal
South Asian Games medalists in football